Sedona is a Turkish bicycle manufacturer that produces many types of bike known for its road, racing, mountain bikes and single speed bikes. The company was founded 1981 in Istanbul as Aslı Bisiklet and then in 2005, first Sedona brand produced.

References

External links 
 Sedona webpage
 Aslı Bisiklet webpage

Mountain bike manufacturers
Cycle manufacturers of Turkey
Manufacturing companies based in Istanbul